Esther Chebet (born 10 September 1997) is a Ugandan middle-distance runner. She finished fifth at the 2019 African Games (1500 m). At the 2019 World Cross Country Championships held in Aarhus, Denmark she finished fourteenth in the senior race and won a bronze medal in the team competition.

She competed at the 2016 World U20 Championships (800 m), the 2017 World Championships (1500 m) and the 2019 World Championships (1500 m) without reaching the final.

Her personal best times are 2:03.28 minutes in the 800 metres, achieved in July 2016 in Kampala; 4:02.90 minutes in the 1500 metres, achieved in May 2019 in Nanjing; and 4:28.16 minutes in the mile run, achieved in July 2017 in Lausanne.

In June 2021, she qualified to represent Uganda at the 2020 Summer Olympics.

References

External links
 

1997 births
Living people
Ugandan female middle-distance runners
World Athletics Championships athletes for Uganda
Athletes (track and field) at the 2019 African Games
African Games competitors for Uganda
Place of birth missing (living people)
Athletes (track and field) at the 2020 Summer Olympics
Olympic athletes of Uganda
20th-century Ugandan women
21st-century Ugandan women